An album produced as a joint effort between Johnette Napolitano and James Mankey, previously founding members of alternative rock band Concrete Blonde, and L.A. pachucho punk band Los Illegals. It contains a blend of hard rock and Latin music.

Reception
Los Angeles Times reviewer Enrique Lopetegui rated the album 2-½ out of 4 stars, opining that "there are plenty of good moments here" but "very few strong songs"; he singled out the "Chicano rap" record "Ode to Rosa Lopez", about a witness in the O. J. Simpson murder case, for praise as the "riskiest" track on the album.   Jae-Ha Kim of the Chicago Sun-Times rated it 1-½ out of 4 stars, finding a lack of cohesion and a failure to showcase Napolitano's distinctive voice.  Thom Owens of AllMusic's rating was 2-½ out of 5 stars, finding the project to be "a stylistic departure that reads better than it plays" due to weak songwriting.

Track listing
"Caminando"
"Viva La Vida"
"La Llorona"
"Echoes"
"Despierta"
"Another Hundred Years Of Solitude"	
"Maria Elena (Letter From L.A.)"
"Ode To Rosa Lopez"	
"Xich Vs. The Migra Zombies"
"Deportee"

References

Concrete Blonde albums
Los Illegals albums
1997 albums